Helldone was an annual music festival organized by Finnish gothic rock band HIM. Typically held on 31 December at the Tavastia Club, and its companion club the Semifinal, in Helsinki, Finland, Helldone began in 1999 as an annual New Year's Eve show for HIM, which grew out of vocalist Ville Valo's "hatred for music parties" and need to "do something more than just get fucked up at midnight". The shows were expanded into a festival in 2005 and renamed Helldone after the band's booking agent Tiina Vuorinen, née Welldone, and their hometown of Helsinki. Helldone also took-up a policy of named tickets, where attendees were required to provide identification matching their ticket upon entry to the venue.

In 2008, Helldone was expanded into a tour, which took the festival across Finland, before returning to Helsinki on New Year's Eve. Helldone took breaks in 2010 and 2011, partly due to HIM drummer Gas Lipstick's health issues, before returning in 2012. The festival took another break in 2016, due to the band members' other commitments. On 7 August 2017, HIM announced the return of Helldone for 31 December 2017, which would also serve as the band's final show before disbanding. Additional dates were later released going through 27 December to 30 December 2017 across Finland, including a show at the Helsinki Ice Hall.

Annually sold-out and attended by people from around the world, Helldone hosted many bands over its tenure, including local artists such as The 69 Eyes, Swallow the Sun and Children of Bodom, as well as international acts like Cathedral, Anathema and Paradise Lost.

Performers

2005

2006

2007

2008

2009

2012

2013

2014

2015

2017

 In a  smaller "Black Box" capacity

References

External links
  of HIM

HIM (Finnish band)
Music festivals in Finland
Heavy metal festivals in Finland
Rock festivals in Finland
Festivals in Helsinki
Recurring events established in 1999
Music festivals established in 2005
Winter events in Finland